Sangam Lal Gupta (born 1 April 1971) is an Indian politician from Uttar Pradesh. He was elected as BJP member to Lok Sabha in 2019 from Pratapgarh Lok Sabha seat. Before that, he was elected a member of the Uttar Pradesh Legislative Assembly representing the Pratapgarh Vidhan Sabha constituency of Uttar Pradesh in 2017 as a member of Apna Dal (Sonelal). He was promoted as National General Secretary of Bhartiya Janata Party OBC Morcha in March 2021.

References 

Living people
Apna Dal (Sonelal) politicians
Uttar Pradesh MLAs 2017–2022
India MPs 2019–present
Lok Sabha members from Uttar Pradesh
Bharatiya Janata Party politicians from Uttar Pradesh
People from Pratapgarh, Uttar Pradesh
1971 births